Alt Glacier is a glacier in Antarctica. It was mapped by the United States Geological Survey from surveys and U.S. Navy air photos, 1960–64, and was named by the Advisory Committee on Antarctic Names for Jean Alt, a French observer and weather central meteorologist at Little America V, winter party 1958. The glacier is situated on the Pennell Coast, a portion of Antarctica lying between Cape Williams and Cape Adare.

References 

Glaciers of Pennell Coast